Rangula Ratnam may refer to:

 Rangula Ratnam (1966 film), a 1966 Telugu film
 Rangula Ratnam (2018 film), a 2018 Telugu film